The term serviceman, alternatively service member, refers to enlisted members of a nation's armed forces. More generally, the term can be applied to officers as well.

For more information see:
Soldier
Sailor
Airman
Marine
Coast guard
National Guard (disambiguation)

See also
 Troop (disambiguation)

Military life
Military specialisms